Betty Compton (born Violet Halling Compton; May 13, 1904  – July 12, 1944), was an English actress and singer, who married New York City mayor Jimmy Walker in 1933.

Compton was born Violet Halling Compton in Sandown, Isle of Wight. She moved to Canada with her parents when she was seven years old. She studied singing in New York City with Estelle Liebling.

A member of the Ziegfeld Follies, she appeared in the original stage production of Funny Face (1927) alongside Fred Astaire and Adele Astaire, as well as Oh, Kay! in 1926.

Compton married film dialog director Edward D. Dowling on February 16, 1931, in Cuernavaca, Mexico, and they were divorced in that city on March 20, 1931. She had received a divorce from a previous marriage in 1923. She married Walker on April 18, 1933, in Cannes, France. On May 11, 1942, Compton married consulting engineer Theodore Knappen in Jersey City. That was her fourth wedding. She and Knappen had a son, Theodore Compton Knappen. She and Walker adopted a son, James J. Walker II, and a daughter, Mary Ann Walker.

On July 12, 1944, Compton died of breast cancer in Doctors Hospital, New York, aged 40.

References

Sources
Isle of Wight Family History Society

External links

portrait(archived)
Betty Compton and Jimmy Walker appear in court during adoption process(archived)
three portraits of Betty Compton: one, ..two,..three

1904 births
1944 deaths
20th-century English actresses
English musical theatre actresses
English film actresses
English women singers
Deaths from cancer in New York (state)
People from Sandown
Deaths from breast cancer
British emigrants to the United States
20th-century English singers
20th-century American women singers
20th-century American actresses
20th-century American singers